The Baker may refer to:

 The Baker (Indianapolis, Indiana), historic apartment building
 The Baker (film), 2007 British comedy crime thriller film

See also 
 Baker (disambiguation)
 The Baker's Wife, musical
 The Baker's Wife (film), 1938 French drama film
 The Baker and the Beauty (disambiguation)
 The Baker's Dozen (concert series), concerts performed by Vermont-based jam band Phish